Mene maculata, the moonfish, is the only extant member of the genus Mene and of the family Menidae. The body is highly compressed laterally and very deep vertically. The ventral profile is steep, with a sharp ventral edge. The caudal (tail) fin is deeply forked. The mouth is small and protrusible. The body is silvery below and blue-green on the back, with three to four rows of dark gray spots on the upper side. The first two rays of the pelvic fin are greatly elongated, forming a prominent backward-pointing process on the underside of the fish.

The moonfish is native to the Indian Ocean, including the Red Sea and Persian Gulf, and in the western Pacific where they can be found near the bottom in brackish and marine waters in the vicinity of reefs. This species can reach a length of  TL. It is a commercially important species, being easy to dry without having to be salted.

See also
 Living fossil

References

Menidae
Fish described in 1801